The Young Christian Democrats (Norway) (KrFU) is the youth league of the Christian Democratic Party in Norway, and was founded in 1933. The current leader of KrFU is Martine Tønnesen. The organisation currently has approximately 2,000 members.

References

External links

Youth wings of conservative parties
Christian Democrats
Youth organizations established in 1933
1933 establishments in Norway